Endeavour is a village in the Canadian province of Saskatchewan within the Rural Municipality of Preeceville No. 334 and Census Division No. 9. The Endeavour railway station receives Via Rail service, as well the village can be accessed via Highway 9.

History 
Endeavour incorporated as a village on April 29, 1953. The community, originally named Annette, was renamed Endeavour after the first attempted commercial passenger flight across the Atlantic in 1930.

Demographics 

In pop-culture

A feature on Mars was named for the village: the crater Endeavour, which the rover Opportunity has been investigating since 2011.

Johnny Cash makes reference to Endeavour in his song 'The Girl in Saskatoon': "I left a little town a little south of Hudson Bay."

See also 

 List of communities in Saskatchewan
 Villages of Saskatchewan

References

Villages in Saskatchewan
Preeceville No. 334, Saskatchewan
Division No. 9, Saskatchewan